Wu Yang (born January 5, 1992) is a Chinese table tennis player. She won the gold medal in the team events in the Asian Table Tennis Championships in 2009. She won the singles title at the 2009 World Junior Table Tennis Championships. She is known for her unorthodox but consistent chopping style, and can also be a strong counter-attacker.

References

Chinese female table tennis players
Living people
1992 births
Asian Games medalists in table tennis
Table tennis players at the 2014 Asian Games
Asian Games gold medalists for China
Asian Games silver medalists for China
Medalists at the 2014 Asian Games
People from Yangquan
Table tennis players from Shanxi